Pegasus II may refer to:

 Pegasus Dwarf Spheroidal Galaxy
 Pegasus II (rocket)
 Pegasus 2 (satellite)

See also
 Pegasus (disambiguation)